The Castlegar Rebels are a junior 'B' ice hockey team based in Castlegar, British Columbia, Canada. They are members of the Neil Murdoch Division of the Kootenay Conference of the Kootenay International Junior Hockey League (KIJHL). The Rebels play their home games at the Castlegar and District Community Complex.

The Rebels played junior 'A' in the Rocky Mountain Junior Hockey League from 1996 until 1998.

History

The Rebels joined the league in 1976 as an expansion team. The Rebels have won the KIJHL Championship four times, in 1977, 1978, 1996 and 2013. They won four division titles as a member of the Western Division from 1976 to 1996, two division titles as a member of the Neil Murdoch Division from 2007 to 2013; two conference titles as a member of the Kootenay Conference from 2007 to 2013.

Season-by-season record
Note: GP = Games played, W = Wins, L = Losses, T = Ties, D = Defaults, OTL = Overtime Losses, Pts = Points, GF = Goals for, GA = Goals against

Final records as of March 3, 2023.

Playoffs

NHL alumni

Steve Bozek
Travis Green
Dane Jackson
Steve Junker
Darcy Martini
Brian Skrudland
Gordie Walker

Awards and trophies

KIJHL Championship
1976–77
1977–78
1995–96
2012–13

Coach of the Year
Pat Price : 1995-1996 (Divisional)
Brent Heaven: 2009–10 (Divisional)
Steve Junker: 2010–11 (Divisional)
 Jesse Dorrans 2014-15 (Divisional)

Most Sportsmanlike
Cody Steele: 2007–08 (Divisional)
Ed Lindsey: 2016–17 (Divisional)

Most Valuable Player
Graham Fleming: 2004–05 (Divisional)
Eric Rockney: 2007–08 (Divisional)
Andrew Walton: 2009–10 (Divisional)
Ryan Aynsley: 2010–11 (Divisional)
John Moeller: 2016–17 (Divisional)

Rookie of the Year
Evan Bloodoff: 2005–06 (Divisional)

Top Defenceman
Darren Tarasoff: 2010–11 (Divisional)

Top Goaltender
Brady Robinson: 2001–02 (Divisional)
Andrew Walton: 2007–08 (Divisional)
Alex Ross: 2010–11 (Divisional)

Top Scorer
Dion Resicini: 1995-1996 (Divisional)
Carson Hamill: 2004–05 (Divisional)
Eric Rockney: 2007–08 (Divisional)
Ryan Aynsley: 2010–11 (Divisional)
Logan Styler: 2016–17 (KIJHL)

References

External links
Official website of the Castlegar Rebels

Castlegar, British Columbia
Ice hockey teams in British Columbia
1976 establishments in British Columbia
Ice hockey clubs established in 1976